Forestville is a census-designated place (CDP) in Schuylkill County, Pennsylvania, United States. The population was 431 at the 2000 census.

Geography
Forestville is located at  (40.690267, -76.295394).

Demographics
At the 2000 census there were 431 people, 191 households, and 126 families living in the CDP. The population density was 505.8 people per square mile (195.8/km). There were 207 housing units at an average density of 242.9/sq mi (94.0/km).  The racial makeup of the CDP was 100.00% White.
Of the 191 households 24.6% had children under the age of 18 living with them, 50.8% were married couples living together, 12.0% had a female householder with no husband present, and 34.0% were non-families. 30.9% of households were one person and 15.2% were one person aged 65 or older. The average household size was 2.26 and the average family size was 2.84.

The age distribution was 17.6% under the age of 18, 6.7% from 18 to 24, 24.8% from 25 to 44, 27.1% from 45 to 64, and 23.7% 65 or older. The median age was 46 years. For every 100 females, there were 88.2 males. For every 100 females age 18 and over, there were 88.8 males.

The median household income was $35,156 and the median family income  was $41,250. Males had a median income of $36,250 versus $20,313 for females. The per capita income for the CDP was $20,599. About 5.3% of families and 6.9% of the population were below the poverty line, including 4.2% of those under age 18 and 10.2% of those age 65 or over.

References

External links
 US Census Bureau map of Forestville CDP

Census-designated places in Schuylkill County, Pennsylvania
Census-designated places in Pennsylvania